Kettle of Fish (88-98) is the title of a compilation album by Fish released in 1998, providing a retrospective on his solo career plus two new songs. Unlike the previous best-of Yin and Yang (1995), this is a single disc and does not include any Marillion material. Kettle of Fish was Fish's first release under a new contract with Roadrunner Records, who signed Fish after the financially catastrophic Sunsets on Empire album and tour of 1997 had forced him to dissolve his own label Dick Brothers Record Company. (The Dick Bros. logo still appears on the back, but this appears to be strictly symbolic.) Roadrunner also re-released Fish's entire backcatalogue; Kettle of Fish was intended to draw attention to these titles, which explains the publication of another "best-of" compilation with just one studio album between this and the last one. The album was accompanied by an eponymous collection of video clips with slightly different tracks (see below). In Europe, the limited first edition of the album included a bonus CD-ROM with three videos and additional material.

Tracks
The album contains thirteen tracks, most of which have been singles, in non-chronological order. 
There are three songs each from the first two solo albums, Vigil in a Wilderness of Mirrors (1990) and Internal Exile (1991); "Just Good Friends" from Internal Exile appears in its 1995 re-recorded version featuring Sam Brown. The other two solo albums – Suits (1994) and Sunsets on Empire (1997) - are represented by two songs each. The 1993 studio album with cover versions, Songs from the Mirror, is not represented. Also not included are the singles "The Company" (1990) and "Change of Heart" (1997), which had only been released in Germany and the UK, respectively. Instead, two songs that were planned as singles but never released, are included – "Lucky" (1991) and "Goldfish and Clowns" (1997). All tracks appear in their original album versions, except for "Goldfish and Clowns" and "Lady Let It Lie", of which the single edits are used.
Additionally, the album contains two new tracks. Both are products of Fish's participation in a songwriters retreat organised by Miles Copeland III at his castle Marouatte in France (incidentally the same place where Marillion had recorded Brave) in the spring of 1998. "Mr. Buttons" was co-written with Maia Sharp and Andy Gardiner; "Chasing Miss Pretty", a pure pop song, with Chris Braide and American guitarist Dave Bassett. (Another three songs from these sessions would end up on the forthcoming album Raingods with Zippos.) "Chasing Miss Pretty" was planned as a single, but never materialised.

Cover art
The cover is, by Fish's standards, simplistic; it shows a goldfish in an undersized, kettle-shaped aquarium on a black background. The illustration was created by web designer Mo Warden, who also runs his official site. Regular Fish album designer Mark Wilkinson is credited for "sleeve design", although it is not clear what for; it could be in reference to the thumbnail-sized covers of the singles that are included in the lyrics booklet.

Video version
In December 1998, a video compilation with the same title was released, which has a different running order and a different selection of eleven tracks. It contains the promotional videos for ten Fish singles released to that point. Again, the singles "The Company" and "Change of Heart", for which no videos were made, are missing, as are the four new/non-single tracks found the album version. Instead, there are videos for two songs not on the album: Fish's version of the 1972 Argent hit "Hold Your Head Up", which had been the A-side of the only single from the 1993 cover album Songs from the Mirror. The second non-album video is of Tony Banks's single "Shortcut to Somewhere" (1986) from his album Soundtracks, which featured Fish on lead vocals. This had been Fish's first ever recording outside Marillion.

Track listing

CD
Note: "Dick" is Fish's surname.
 "Big Wedge" – 05:19 (Dick/Simmonds) — from Vigil in a Wilderness of Mirrors, 1990
 "Just Good Friends" (with Sam Brown) – 05:48 (Dick/Usher/Boult/Simmonds) — originally from Internal Exile, 1991, this version from Yin, 1995
 "Brother 52" – 06:06 (Dick/Wilson) — from Sunsets on Empire, 1997
 "Chasing Miss Pretty" – 4.53 (Dick/Braide/Bassett) — new track
 "Credo" – 06:41 (Dick/Simmonds/Boult/Usher) — from Internal Exile, 1991
 "A Gentleman's Excuse Me" – 04:19 (Dick/Simmonds) — from Vigil in a Wilderness of Mirrors, 1990
 "Goldfish and Clowns" – 06:38 (Dick/Wilson) — from Sunsets on Empire, 1997
 "Lady Let It Lie" – 04:12 (Dick/Paton/Cassidy) — edited version taken from Suits, 1994
 "Lucky" (1995 Re-recording) – 04:58 (Dick/Boult/Simmonds) — originally from Internal Exile, 1991, this version from Yang, 1995
 "State Of Mind" – 04:46 (Dick/Simmonds/Lindes) — from Vigil in a Wilderness of Mirrors, 1990
 "Mr. Buttons" – 4.36 (Dick/Gardiner/Sharp) — new track
 "Fortunes Of War" – 07:54 (Dick/Cassidy/Boult) — from Suits, 1994
 "Internal Exile" – 04:41 (Dick/Boult/Simmonds) — from Internal Exile, 1991
Total Time 70:51

DVD
Albums and credits as above except where noted.
 "State Of Mind" - directed by Michael Geoghegan
 "Big Wedge" - directed by Michael Geoghegan
 "A Gentleman's Excuse Me" - directed by Julian Doyle 1990
 "Internal Exile" - directed by Brian Ward, produced by Iain Brown 1991
 "Credo" - directed by Tony Van Den Ende, produced by Kathy Hood 1991
 "Hold Your Head Up" (Argent/White), from Songs from the Mirror (1992/1993) - directed by David Barnard, produced by Perry Asincomo 1992
 "Lady Let It Lie" - directed by Dave Miller, produced by Ed Booth 1994
 "Fortunes Of War" - directed by Hamish Barbour, produced by Ed Booth 1994
 "Just Good Friends" (with Sam Brown) - directed by Hamish Barbour 1995
 "Brother 52" - directed by Steve Flack 1997, produced by Jane Rigby and Jim Leishman, with the co-operation of the students of Dundee University's Duncan of Jordanstone College of Art and Design
 "Shortcut to Somewhere" (with Tony Banks) (Dick, Banks), from the soundtrack of Quicksilver, featured on the Tony Banks album Soundtracks

The videos for "Fortunes of War", "Brother 52" and "Just Good Friends" were also on a CD-ROM included with the first 30,000 copies of the audio version.

Fish (singer) albums
1998 compilation albums
Albums produced by Chris Kimsey
Albums produced by Jon Kelly